Lawrence Pearson (born 2 July 1965) is an English former footballer who played at left-back. He made 91 league appearances in the Football League, and also spent a number of seasons in non-League football.

He began his career at Manchester United, playing in the 1982 FA Youth Cup final. He joined Hull City via Gateshead in 1984, and helped the club to win promotion out of the Third Division. He signed with Bristol City, before being traded to Port Vale in August 1987. He left the "Valiants" in January 1988, and played non-league football for Whitley Bay and Barrow. He briefly played with the Canadian Soccer League side Winnipeg Fury in 1990, before making a brief comeback in the Football League in 1993–94 with Darlington and Chesterfield. He then moved onto Blyth Spartans, and worked behind the scenes at Middlesbrough and Carlisle United.

Career
Pearson began his career at Manchester United, and was part of the side that were beaten by Watford in the final of the FA Youth Cup in 1982; his teammates in the game included Clayton Blackmore, Mark Hughes and Norman Whiteside. He never made his debut at Old Trafford though, and instead got his first taste of Football League action after he joined Brian Horton's Hull City via non-league Gateshead in 1984. The "Tigers" won promotion from the Third Division in 1984–85, before posting sixth and 14th-place finishes in the Second Division in 1985–86 and 1986–87. Pearson departed Boothferry Park and signed with Third Division Bristol City, but did not make a league appearance for his new club.

He was traded to league rivals Port Vale, along with £25,000, in exchange for Russell Bromage in August 1987. He made his debut in a 4–2 win over Aldershot at Vale Park on 15 August, but after playing the next two games manager John Rudge signed Darren Hughes as a replacement. He only played three further cup games for the "Valiants", before having his contract cancelled by mutual consent in January 1988.

He moved on to non-League outfits Whitley Bay (Northern League) and Barrow (Northern Premier League and Conference), and spent time in Belgium. He also made five appearances in the Canadian Soccer League for the Winnipeg Fury in 1990, scoring two goals. He also played one of the two-legged play-off quarter-final games with Victoria Vistas. He returned to the English Football League with Darlington in 1993–94. Alan Murray's "Quakers" could only finish one place above the bottom of the league, and Pearson departed Feethams. He played once for Chesterfield, before returning to the non-league circuit with Northern League side Blyth Spartans.

Post-retirement
After retirement he became the community officer at Middlesbrough. He worked in the post for seven years, before leaving the Riverside Stadium when Steve McClaren was appointed manager in 2001. He then was appointed Football in the Community Officer at Carlisle United. He left his post at Brunton Park in January 2005 for 'personal reasons'. He then worked as an academy coach at Manchester United for six years; he left in 2011 and began working at Leeds United. He then retired from coaching and now runs sports camps in Wakefield.

Career statistics
Source:

Honours
Manchester UnitedFA Youth Cup runner-up: 1982Hull City'
Football League Third Division third-place promotion: 1984–85

References

1965 births
Living people
Sportspeople from Wallsend
Footballers from Tyne and Wear
English footballers
Association football defenders
Manchester United F.C. players
Gateshead F.C. players
Hull City A.F.C. players
Bristol City F.C. players
Port Vale F.C. players
Whitley Bay F.C. players
Barrow A.F.C. players
Winnipeg Fury players
Darlington F.C. players
Chesterfield F.C. players
Blyth Spartans A.F.C. players
English Football League players
Northern Premier League players
National League (English football) players
Canadian Soccer League (1987–1992) players
Association football coaches
Middlesbrough F.C. non-playing staff
Carlisle United F.C. non-playing staff
Manchester United F.C. non-playing staff
Leeds United F.C. non-playing staff